Limbo is a 2021 Hong Kong action thriller film directed by Cheang Pou-soi and starring Gordon Lam, Cya Liu, Mason Lee and Hiroyuki Ikeuchi. The film is based on the novel Wisdom Tooth by Chinese novelist Lei Mi.

The film had its worldwide premiere at the 71st Berlin International Film Festival on 1 March 2021, and was theatrically released in Hong Kong on 18 November 2021.

Plot
Rookie police officer Will Yam (Mason Lee) is a recent graduate of the police academy. Due to a wave of serial killings, Will is partnered with veteran officer Cham Lau (Gordon Lam), who was recently reinstated on the force. However, the duo is unable to solve the cases and instead causes a series of incidents. Later, Cham re-encounters a drug-addicted street urchin, Wong To (Cya Liu), who ran over his wife and daughter in the past, and his anger makes him spiral out of control and continuously abuses her. Will clumsily loses his pistol, which is found by the serial killer. With the killer lurking in the city, a crisis grows closer.

Cast
Gordon Lam as Cham Lau (劉中選), respectfully referred to as Brother Cham (斬哥), a veteran police officer of the Regional Crime Unit.
Cya Liu as Wong To (王桃), a drug-addicted street urchin who ran over Cham's wife in a DUI, leaving her in a vegetative state and becomes Cham's informant in order to repent her past mistake.
Mason Lee as Will Yam (任凱), a rookie police officer of the Regional Crime Unit and Cham's new partner.
Hiroyuki Ikeuchi as Yamada Akira (山田收), a waste picker with Oedipus complex and acrotomophilia.
Fish Liew as Coco (可樂), a disabled drug dealer.
Hugo Ng as Chief (大Sir), Cham and Will's superior officer.
Sammy Sum as Boss Spark (逼啪)
Hanna Chan as Will's wife
Kumer as Grizzly (灰熊)

Production
Principal photography for Limbo began in September 2017 in Hong Kong and wrapped up after three months filming, with To Kwa Wan and Kwun Tong being the main filming locations as many old buildings are located in these districts of the city.

On 2 October 2017, filming of a fight scene between actors Gordon Lam and Hiroyuki Ikeuchi took place on a rooftop in Kwun Tong. Both Lam and Ikeuchi lost 8 pounds and 30 pounds of weight respectively for their roles in the film. On 8 October 2017, which was also Lam's birthday, filming took place in Kowloon Bay for a scene where Lam was going through a garbage chute looking for evidence.

Release
Limbo had its world premiere at the 71st Berlin International Film Festival, which was held virtually from 1 to 5 March 2021. The film was later shown in competition at the 23rd Far East Film Festival from 25 to 26 June 2021 where it won the Purple Mulberry Award  The film was released in Hong Kong on 18 November 2021.

Reception

Box office
In Hong Kong, the film grossed HK$740,238 during its first four days of release, opening at No. 5 during its debut weekend. On its second weekend, the film grossed HK$563,365, coming in at No. 10, and have grossed a total of HK$1,276,603 so far.

Critical reception
Lee Marshall of Screen Daily praises director Cheang Pou-soi's "dystopian vision of an Asian metropolis in the throes of a political and social identity crisis" as the film's "most striking feature." Jessica Kiang of Variety praises the film's well-choreographed action sequences which compliment Cheng Siu-Keung's dazzling camera work.

Awards and nominations

References

2021 films
2021 action thriller films
Hong Kong action thriller films
Hong Kong black-and-white films
Hong Kong serial killer films
Police detective films
2020s Cantonese-language films
Films directed by Cheang Pou-soi
Films based on Chinese novels
Films based on thriller novels
Films set in Hong Kong
Films shot in Hong Kong